The Achucarro Basque Center for Neuroscience is a BERC (Basque Excellence Research Center) research center devoted to neuroscience and created by Ikerbasque – the Basque Foundation for Science  and the University of the Basque Country (UPV/EHU) in mid-2012. The center is named after Nicolas Achucarro (Bilbao, 1880–1918), the first internationally recognized Basque neuroscientist.

The center is located at the Science Park of UPV/EHU, within the campus of University of the Basque Country, in Leioa, Spain.

The research focus of the center is the study of neuronal-glial biology in normal and pathological brain, which is the base for training students and disseminate the acquired knowledge to the Society, so well-being of people and sustainable social development is fostered.

References 

Neuroscience research centers in Spain